Andrew Warriner Combs is an American singer, songwriter, and guitarist from Dallas, Texas, who currently resides in Nashville, Tennessee.

Career
Andrew Combs released his debut EP, Tennessee Time, in May 2010, which has been compared to Mickey Newbury and Guy Clark. In April 2012, Combs released a vinyl 7-inch called "Big Bad Love".

In July 2012, Combs signed to the Nashville-based music publishing arm of New York City record label, Razor & Tie.

In October 2012, Combs released Worried Man, which American Songwriter gave a 4-star review, writing: "As singer/songwriter first albums go, it’ll be tough to beat this as one of the years finest, from a newcomer who is hopefully just tapping into his talent."

In 2013, Combs supported Shovels & Rope and Caitlin Rose on national tours and performed at the Newport Folk Festival

In 2015, Combs released All These Dreams, his second studio album.

In 2016, he performed on the main stage at the Country to Country festival in the UK alongside Chris Stapleton, Kacey Musgraves and Eric Church.

Discography

 Worried Man (2012)
 All These Dreams (2015)
 Canyons of my Mind (2017)
 5 Covers and a Song EP (2018)
 Ideal Man (2019)
 Sundays (2022)

References

External links
 

1986 births
Living people
21st-century American singers
American alternative country singers
American country singer-songwriters
Country musicians from Tennessee
Country musicians from Texas
Jesuit College Preparatory School of Dallas alumni 
Musicians from Dallas
Musicians from Nashville, Tennessee
Singer-songwriters from Tennessee
Singer-songwriters from Texas